Dukascopy Bank is a Swiss online bank which provides online and mobile trading, banking and financial services. Headquartered in Geneva, Switzerland, it has offices in Riga, Kyiv, Moscow, Kuala Lumpur, Hong Kong, Shanghai, Dubai and Tokyo, with over 300 employees.

Services
Dukascopy Bank provides online and mobile trading services including foreign exchange, CFDs for stocks, metals, commodities, indices, cryptocurrencies and binary options. Dukascopy Bank also offers current account, e-banking, and credit card services.

Regulation 
Dukascopy Bank is regulated by the Swiss Financial Market Supervisory Authority FINMA both as a bank and a securities dealer. It has three subsidiaries, namely Dukascopy Europe IBS AS, a licensed brokerage company based in Riga, Dukascopy Japan, a Type-1 licensed broker located in Tokyo, and SIA Dukascopy Payments, a European licensed payment and e-money company incorporated in Riga.

Dukascopy Bank became a member of the Swiss Bankers Association in 2012.

History
Dukascopy Bank started in 1998 when a group of physicists headed by Andre Duka launched Dukascopy Trading Technologies Corp to engage in the research, development and implementation of complex financial systems via novel mathematical and econophysical techniques. In 1999, Dukascopy began the development of its trading platform. In 2004, Andre Duka together with his partner Veronika Duka created Swiss Brokerage House Dukascopy. In 2006, Dukascopy launched its ECN, the SWFX Swiss Forex Marketplace. In 2015, Dukascopy Bank SA acquired 100% of Alpari Japan K.K., Tokyo.

References

Foreign exchange companies
Banks of Switzerland
Companies based in Geneva
Banks established in 1998
Swiss companies established in 1998